Hwangnam-dong is a dong or a neighbourhood of the Gyeongju City, North Gyeongsang province, South Korea. It is bordered by Dodong-dong on the east, Tapjeong-dong on the west, Naenam-myeon on the south and Jungang-dong on the north. Its 20.5 square kilometers are home to about 8,885 people. It is both an administrative and legal dong.

Hwangnam-dong has one elementary school.

See also
Subdivisions of Gyeongju
Administrative divisions of South Korea

References

External links
 The official site of the Hwangnam-dong office

Subdivisions of Gyeongju
Neighbourhoods in South Korea